Eamon Morrissey may refer to:

 Eamon Morrissey (actor) (born 1943), Irish actor
 Eamon Morrissey (hurler) (born 1966), former Kilkenny hurler
Éamonn Morrissey (born 1949), hurler